The Paul McCartney Archive Collection is an ongoing project to remaster and reissue Paul McCartney's solo catalogue, including various albums released with Wings. These editions feature deluxe packaging and bonus rare tracks. Thus far, there have been fourteen releases since the project began in 2010 (seven solo albums, six Wings albums, and one new Wings live album of previously unreleased material). They are overseen by McCartney himself and remastered at Abbey Road Studios. Albums reissued in this project are visually marked by a white stripe along the left side of the album cover that reads "Paul McCartney Archive Collection" and a copy of McCartney's signature.

The albums are typically released in a variety of formats: a "standard" edition that contains the original album digitally remastered on one CD; a "special" edition which contains additional discs of bonus tracks; and a "deluxe" edition which comes with extra features like bonus CDs or DVDs of unreleased material packaged in a hard-bound book. Some releases contain booklets, rare photos, interviews, artwork, promotional video clips, or documentaries. The "special" editions of the albums were also released as double LPs on 180 gram "audiophile vinyl", with the original album on one record and bonus material on the second. The records also came with a download card for MP3 versions of all tracks included. The special editions of the albums are available on streaming services worldwide.

Releases
Below is a list of albums that have been reissued so far. Paul McCartney has stated that Back to the Egg and London Town are slated for an upcoming release.

Reception

The Paul McCartney Archive Collection received two Grammy Awards.

|-
| 2012 || Band on the Run || Best Historical Album || 
|-
| rowspan="2" | 2013 || rowspan="2" | Ram || Best Historical Album || 
|-
| Best Boxed or Special Limited Edition Package || 
|-
| 2014 || Wings over America || Best Boxed or Special Limited Edition Package || 
|-
| 2017 || Tug of War || Best Boxed or Special Limited Edition Package || 
|-
| 2021 || Flaming Pie || Best Boxed or Special Limited Edition Package ||

References

Reissue albums
Albums produced by Paul McCartney
Paul McCartney and Wings albums
Grammy Award for Best Historical Album